Ham sandwich may refer to:

 Ham sandwich, a popular sandwich
 Ham and cheese sandwich, a variation on the ham sandwich
 Ham Sandwich (band), a musical group
 Ham Sandwich (song), a 2019 experimental trap song by Getter.
 Ham sandwich theorem, a mathematical result
 Ham sandwich, a slang term for false evidence planted by a police officer to frame an individual